Chidgey is a surname. Notable people with the surname include:

Catherine Chidgey (born 1970), New Zealand novelist and writer
David Chidgey, Baron Chidgey (1942–2022), Liberal Democrat politician in the United Kingdom
Graham Chidgey (born 1937), former English cricketer
Harry Chidgey (1879–1941), English first-class cricketer and Test match umpire